Hurley, England may refer to:

Hurley, Berkshire
Hurley, Warwickshire